La Figuerosa is a hamlet located in the municipality of Tàrrega, in Province of Lleida province, Catalonia, Spain. As of 2020, it has a population of 47.

Geography 
La Figuerosa is located 60km east of Lleida.

References

Populated places in the Province of Lleida